Christel Meinel (born December 24, 1957) is a former East German cross-country skier who competed during the late 1970s. She won a silver medal in the 4 × 5 km relay at the 1978 FIS Nordic World Ski Championships in Lahti and finished fifth in the 5 km at those same championships. She competed for SC Dynamo Klingenthal.

Cross-country skiing results

World Championships
 1 medal – (1 silver)

External links

World Championship results

References 

German female cross-country skiers
Living people
FIS Nordic World Ski Championships medalists in cross-country skiing
1957 births